is Sachi Tainaka's second single and was released on May 31, 2006. The title track was used as the second opening theme for the Japanese animation Fate/stay night from episodes 15 to 23.

The single reached number nine in Japan. The CD's catalog number is GNCX-0003.

Track listing

References

2006 singles
Sachi Tainaka songs